Events in the year 1959 in Norway.

Incumbents
 Monarch – Olav V
 Prime Minister – Einar Gerhardsen (Labour Party)

Events

 16 February – The Norwegian National Opera and Ballet holds its first performance in Folketeatret in Oslo.
 26 June – The "Farmers' Party" (Bondepartiet) changes its name to the "Centre Party" (Senterpartiet).
 19 July – Nikita Khrushchev cancels a planned visit to Norway, among others due to an alleged anti-Soviet press coverage.
 29 December – The Norwegian government signs the EFTA free trade treaty. Norway becomes an EFTA member.
 Municipal and county elections are held throughout the country.

Popular culture

Sports

Music

Film

Literature
Harald Sverdrup, poet and children's writer, is awarded the Mads Wiel Nygaard's Endowment literary prize.

Notable births

19 January – 
Arne Borgstrøm, swimmer.
Sigmund Steinnes, politician (died 2018).
27 January – Elizabeth Norberg-Schulz, operatic soprano.
10 February – Steinar Ness, politician.
13 February – Arne Thomassen, politician.
23 February – Sidsel Wold, correspondent and non-fiction writer.
27 February – Tore Sagvolden, orienteering competitor.
9 March – Nils T. Bjørke, farmer, organisational leader and politician.
10 March – Ruth Mari Grung, politician.
16 March – Jens Stoltenberg, prime minister and Secretary-General of NATO
23 March – Unni Larsen, racing cyclist and dogsled racer.
1 April – Pål Farstad, politician.
3 April – Hanne Bramness, poet and translator.
2 May – Sanna Grønlid, biathlete.
6 May – Morten Staubo, speed skater.
27 June – Thure Erik Lund, author
29 June – Harald Tveit Alvestrand, computer scientist
5 July – Synnøve Brenden Klemetrud, politician
8 July – Tom Egeland, author
27 August – Frode Fjellheim, Sami musician
14 September – Morten Harket, A-ha lead singer
29 September – Jon Fosse, author and dramatist
21 October – Åslaug Haga, politician and Minister
1 November – Pål Gerhard Olsen, author.
7 November – Kristin Glosimot Kjelsberg, handball player.
28 November – Lars Sørgard, economist and civil servant.
28 December – Ragnhild Noer, judge.

Notable deaths
21 March – Hartvig Caspar Christie, politician (born 1893)
17 May – Alf Grindrud, politician (born 1904)
16 June – Konrad Knudsen, painter, journalist and politician (born 1890)
3 July – Johan Bojer, novelist and dramatist (born 1872)
15 July – Peter Egge, writer (born 1869)
28 July – Roald Larsen, speed skater and Olympic silver medallist (born 1898)
5 September – Sigvald Hasund, researcher of agriculture, politician and Minister (born 1868)
21 November – Olav Meisdalshagen, politician and Minister (born 1903)

Full date unknown
Eivind Berggrav, Lutheran bishop (born 1884)
Sverre Grette, judge (born 1888)
Kristian Hansson, jurist and civil servant (born 1895)
Olaf Norli, bookseller and publisher (born 1861)
Lars Slagsvold, veterinarian (born 1887)
Sverre Kornelius Eilertsen Støstad, politician and Minister (born 1887)
G. Unger Vetlesen, shipbuilder and philanthropist (born 1889)

See also

References

External links